The following are the association football events of the year 1882 throughout the world.

Events
Ireland played their first international friendly on 18 February 1882 against England losing 0–13 in Belfast.

Clubs founded in 1882

England
Burnley F.C.
Corinthian F.C.
Gresley Rovers F.C.
Oxford City F.C.
Queens Park Rangers F.C.
Skelmersdale United F.C.
Torquay United F.C.
Tottenham Hotspur F.C.

Scotland
Albion Rovers F.C.

Sweden
Gefle IF

Domestic cups

Births
 4 April – Harold Hardman (d. 1965), England international forward in four matches (1905–1908).
 23 April – Tom Brittleton (d. 1955), England international half-back in five matches (1912–1914).
 26 August – Sam Hardy (d. 1966), England international goalkeeper in 21 matches (1907–1920).
 8 October – Jock Walker (d. 1968), Scotland international full-back in nine matches (1911–1913).
 11 October – Arthur Bridgett (d. 1954), England international forward in eleven matches (1905–1909), scoring three goals.
 21 October – Jimmy Windridge (d. 1939), England international forward in eight matches (1908–1909), scoring seven goals.

References

 
Association football by year